Rebecca Turner is a British swimmer. At the 2012 Summer Olympics she finished 17th overall in the heats in the Women's 200 metre freestyle and failed to reach the semifinals.

References

British female swimmers
Living people
Olympic swimmers of Great Britain
Swimmers at the 2012 Summer Olympics
British female freestyle swimmers
Commonwealth Games medallists in swimming
Commonwealth Games silver medallists for England
Commonwealth Games bronze medallists for England
Swimmers at the 2014 Commonwealth Games
1992 births
21st-century British women
Medallists at the 2014 Commonwealth Games